

Canadian Football News in 1902
The Hamilton Tigers ceased operations after one game, citing poor player turnout and a lack of ticket revenue. Consequently, Toronto Argonauts and Ottawa Rough Riders were the only two teams to play in the Ontario Rugby Football Union this season.

Regular season

Final regular season standings
Note: GP = Games Played, W = Wins, L = Losses, T = Ties, PF = Points For, PA = Points Against, Pts = Points
*Bold text means that they have clinched the playoffs

League Champions

Playoffs

Dominion Championship

References

 
Canadian Football League seasons